Sindri may refer to:

 Sindri (Dhanbad), a neighbourhood in India
 Sindri (DJ)
 Sindri (mythology), a dwarf or a hall in Norse mythology
 Sindri, Burkina Faso
 Sindri, a minor character from the 2008–2012 BBC series Merlin, who appears in the Season 5 episode A Lesson in Vengeance, played by Tony Guilfoyle

See also
 Sindris